Carter Dome, or simply The Dome, is a mountain located in Coos County, New Hampshire. The mountain is part of the Carter-Moriah Range of the White Mountains, which runs along the northern east side of Pinkham Notch.  Carter Dome is flanked to the northeast by Mount Hight and to the southwest by Wildcat Mountain  (across Carter Notch).

The origins of Carter Dome's name is unknown. Local folklore suggests that it was named after a hunter named Carter, while a neighboring peak is named after his hunting partner, Hight.

The mountain is ascended from the west by the Carter Dome Trail and Nineteen Mile Brook Trail, and from the east by the Black Angel Trail.

See also

 Four-thousand footers
 List of mountains in New Hampshire
 White Mountain National Forest

References

External links
 "Hiking Carter Dome". Appalachian Mountain Club.
 

Mountains of New Hampshire
Mountains of Coös County, New Hampshire
New England Four-thousand footers
Mountains on the Appalachian Trail